La farfalla dalle ali d'oro is a 1915 Italian film directed by Augusto Genina.

External links

1915 films
Italian silent films
Films directed by Augusto Genina
Italian black-and-white films
Italian drama films
1915 drama films
Silent drama films